Céline is a 1992 French drama film written and directed by Jean-Claude Brisseau. It was entered into the 42nd Berlin International Film Festival.

Cast

References

External links
 
 

1992 films
1992 drama films
1990s French-language films
Films about suicide
Films directed by Jean-Claude Brisseau
Films scored by Georges Delerue
French drama films
Gaumont Film Company films
1990s French films